Imantodes guane is a species of snake in the family Colubridae.  The species is native to Colombia.

References

Imantodes
Snakes of South America
Endemic fauna of Colombia
Reptiles of Colombia
Reptiles described in 2015